Luisito Pio Espinosa (born June 26, 1967) is a Filipino former professional boxer who competed from 1984 to 2005. He is a world champion in two weight classes, having held the WBA bantamweight title from 1989 to 1991 and the WBC featherweight title from 1995 to 1999.

Boxing career
Espinosa turned professional in 1984. In 1989, he won the WBA Bantamweight title by knocking out Kaokor Galaxy in the first round. He was then managed by famed boxing analyst and businessman Hermie Rivera.  Espinosa defended the title twice before losing it to Israel Contreras by a fifth-round knockout in 1991.

Espinosa made an arduous climb back to the top, this time fighting under Joe Koizumi's stable.  His comeback culminated in 1995, when he won the WBC Featherweight title by outpointing Manuel Medina.  In his first title defense, Espinosa knocked out Alejandro "Cobrita" Gonzalez in the 4th round in Mexico.  He then took on the hard-hitting body-puncher César Soto at Luneta (Rizal) Park in Manila and hammered out a well-deserved unanimous decision in front of his countrymen, which included no less than President Fidel V. Ramos.  He defended the title seven times before losing the belt in 1999 to Soto who won by a controversial unanimous decision.  The following year, he challenged Guty Espadas, Jr. for the Vacant WBC Featherweight Title, but was outboxed and lost a technical decision after their fight was stopped after a clash of heads.

Retirement
Espinosa retired in 2005 after a public outcry for him to stop fighting after being knocked out by Cristóbal Cruz. He spent his retirement living in the Los Angeles and San Francisco areas.

Post-boxing career
Due to some promotional and managerial disputes, and divorce Espinosa was left with little. He had to take jobs washing dishes, stocking shelves, flipping burgers and cleaning carpets in the US. Espinosa, who was out of the boxing scene for quite a while, entered the mixed martial arts (MMA) scene by training brothers Nick Diaz and Nate Diaz in boxing to improve their stand-up. He also assisted in the training of the University of San Francisco's Boxing team from 2006-2007 in preparation for the annual Hilltop Cup. After losing his job in the US he was invited to work in Hong Kong as a boxing trainer at the Everlast Fight and Fitness Gym and moved in November 2014. On June 16, 2015, after 17 years, he won a case for prize money that was owed to him his by the promoters of his WBC featherweight title defense against Argentine Carlos Rios. In 2017, he moved to the Everlast Gym as a boxing trainer in downtown Dalian city in mainland China.

Professional boxing record

See also
 History of boxing in the Philippines

References

External links
 

1967 births
Living people
Bantamweight boxers
Featherweight boxers
World boxing champions
World bantamweight boxing champions
World featherweight boxing champions
World Boxing Association champions
World Boxing Council champions
Filipino male boxers
Sportspeople from Manila
Boxers from Metro Manila
People from Tondo, Manila